Thunder Bay Water Aerodrome  is located on Shipyard Road adjacent to Thunder Bay, Ontario, Canada.
The airport is classified as an airport of entry by Nav Canada and is staffed by the Canada Border Services Agency (CBSA). CBSA officers at this airport can handle general aviation aircraft only, with no more than 15 passengers.

Facilities

The aerodrome has two piers that can handle several aircraft parked on the water. A ramp allows aircraft to enter water. There are two hangars, the larger one belonging to Wilderness North. Floatplanes can be parked for storage in an open area next to the smaller Lakehead Aviation hangar. Two smaller buildings next to the water house tenants and customs office.

Tenants

 Wilderness North - fly fishing adventures
 Lakehead Aviation Limited - seaplane base

See also
 List of airports in the Thunder Bay area

References

Registered aerodromes in Ontario
Transport in Thunder Bay
Seaplane bases in Ontario